Snaps is a Danish and Swedish word for a small shot of a strong alcoholic beverage taken during the course of a meal. A ritual that is associated with drinking snaps is a tradition in Scandinavia, especially in Denmark and Sweden, where it is very common to drink snaps at holidays such as Midsummer, Christmas and Easter. This ritual has been described by one author as follows:

A group of people are clustered around a table for a typical lunch that will include several courses and a clear, fiery drink. The host pours the ice-cold liquid into frosty, conical glasses with long stems. He raises his glass, at which point the diners turn to one another and make eye contact, making certain not to leave anyone out. "Skål!" calls out the host, and everyone takes a sip. Again there is eye contact, and then the glasses are set on the table, not to be lifted again until the host raises his. The liquid is aquavit. The ritual is virtually the same throughout Scandinavia. 

In Denmark, a snaps will always be akvavit, although there are many varieties of it. In Sweden, snaps is a more general term; it is usually akvavit, although it may also be vodka, bitters/bitter liqueurs or some other kind of brännvin/brændevin. Spirits such as whisky or brandy are seldom drunk as snaps. One of Finland's strongest alcohol drinks served with snaps is Marskin ryyppy, named after Marshal C. G. E. Mannerheim.

The word "snaps" also has the same meaning as German Schnapps, in the sense of "any strong alcoholic drink".

Culture
An entrée consisting of pickled herring and potatoes is typically served with snaps, as is the Swedish surströmming.

Swedes, Danes and Swedish-speaking Finns have a tradition of singing songs (called snapsvisor) before drinking snaps. These snapsvisor are typically odes to the joys of drinking snaps. They may praise the flavour of snaps or express a craving for it.

Snaps and snapsvisor are essential elements of Swedish crayfish parties, which are notoriously tipsy affairs. Dozens of songs may be sung during such a party, and every song requires a round of snaps. However, the glass need not be emptied every time.

Home liquor production in Scandinavia
Distilling snaps at home is illegal in Scandinavian countries, unless approved by tax authorities.

Illegal home distilling, however, is a widespread tradition, especially in many rural communities of Sweden, Finland and Norway.

A tradition of home flavouring snaps exists in Scandinavia. This tradition is strongest in the southern areas, particularly Denmark. A snaps enthusiast will typically buy a commercially made, neutral-tasting snaps, and then add flavour to it by adding herbs found in nature or grown in a garden. For instance, in northern Denmark, various spices are added to snaps to produce a version called "bjesk", which roughly translated means "bitter". In Hirtshals, the Hirtshals Museum tells the story of the "bjesk".

Popular flavours for home flavouring include Blackthorn, Bog-myrtle, Dill, Persian Walnut, St. John's Wort, Woodruff, and Wormwood. The herbs are commonly used singly, but some enthusiasts experiment with mixing them to achieve the perfect flavour.

See also

Schnapps
Drinking culture
Moonshine

References

External links

Drinking song – snapsvisa
Drinking songs at Spiritmuseum 

Swedish cuisine
Danish cuisine
Distilled drinks
Drinking culture
Swedish distilled drinks

no:Akevitt